Carol Nagy Jacklin (1939 - 2011) was a developmental psychologist and gender scholar. She was the first woman to be dean of the Division of Social Sciences at the University of Southern California. She was a Women's Rights activist.

Education 
Carol Nagy was born in Chicago, Illinois on February 23, 1939. Nagy completed high school in Oak Park. As Nagy was preparing for college at the University of Wisconsin, she met and married her husband, and transferred to the University of Connecticut. Jacklin completed a BA and MA in psychology at the University of Connecticut. Short on money, Carol Jacklin became a teacher at the University of Connecticut and then San Jose City College. After attending a psychology conference she realised she wanted to get a PhD in developmental psychology, after which she applied and was accepted for postgraduate studies at Brown University. She completed her PhD at Brown University in 1972.

Research 
Jacklin moved to Stanford, where she completed postdoctoral studies alongside Eleanor Maccoby. Jacklin and Maccoby began to observe parent-child interactions, identifying negative portrayals of women in scientific literature. Their research was published in the critically acclaimed 1974 book "The Psychology of Sex Differences", which became front page of The New York Times Book Review. In 1975 it was a best seller in The New York Times. Here they dismissed many beliefs about gender differences: that girls are more social than boys, have lower self-esteem and are better at rote learning, arguing that the evidence does not support the existence of gender differences.

At Stanford Jacklin became a vocal women's rights activist, who campaigned against injustices facing women. She was a founding member of the Clayman Institute for Gender Research alongside Myra Strober. In 1983, The New York Times described her as a "leading expert on gender differences". Jacklin and Maccoby were two of the first researchers to study the differences between boys’ and girls’ learning.

Jacklin moved to the University of Southern California in 1983, where she was the first woman to become a tenured psychology professor. She was the first woman to be chair of the psychology department in 1990, the first paid chair of the Program for the Study of Women and Men in Society, and the first woman to be appointed Dean of the Division of Social Sciences in 1992. Jacklin took leave to work with biologists researching endocrinology at Caltech, and implemented policy change to fairly treat women faculty members and students.

In 1995 Jacklin became Dean of the College of William and Mary. She instituted changes in the university's recruitment of women and minorities. With her extensive knowledge of gender differences and similarities, she served as an expert witness in sexual discrimination cases against corporations such as AT&T and General Motors. She helped women seeking admission to the Virginia Military Institute and the Citadel.

Jacklin retired to San Diego, where she became a certified Master Gardener. Jacklin had a daughter, Beth Nagy, and son, Phillip Jacklin. She wrote a newspaper column "Mountain Greening" for local newspapers. In 2011 she rejected Chemotherapy for a diagnosis of terminal cancer, and died one week later.

References 

1939 births
American women's rights activists
American women psychologists
Gender studies academics
Brown University alumni
University of Connecticut alumni
2011 deaths